Leptichnus bernardi is a species of air-breathing land snails or semi-slugs, terrestrial pulmonate gastropod mollusks in the family Urocyclidae.

This species is endemic to Tanzania.

References

Urocyclidae
Endemic fauna of Tanzania
Taxonomy articles created by Polbot